Bharatsinh Madhavsinh Solanki, born on 26 November 1953 in a Rajput family of Gujarat, is an Indian politician and former president of Gujarat Pradesh Congress Committee. He was Minister of State for Union Minister of State for Drinking Water and Sanitation (Independent Charge) in the Government of India in the Second Manmohan Singh ministry till May 2014. His previous posts include that of Minister of State for Power. He has also served as Secretary at All India Congress Committee from 2004 to 2006. He was born to Madhavsinh Solanki, a Koli of Gujarat.

After winning the election twice, in 2004 and 2009, he lost the Anand seat in the 2014 Indian general election to Dilipbhai Patel of BJP.

Offices held
1992 - General Secretary (Gujarat Pradesh Congress Committee)
1995-2004 - Member, Gujarat Legislative Assembly (Three Terms)
2003-2004 - Deputy Leader of Opposition, Gujarat Legislative Assembly
2004-2014 - Member of Parliament
2004 - Secretary, A.I.C.C.
2006 -2008 - President, Gujarat Pradesh Congress Committee
June 2009-January 2011, Union Minister of State of Power, Government of India
January 2011-October 2012, Minister of State for Railways, Govt. of India
October 2012 - May 2014, Minister of State for Drinking Water and Sanitation(Independent Charge), Govt. of India
2015-March 2018 - President, Gujarat Pradesh Congress Committee

He is a former member of the Press Council of India and has served on several committees, including the Joint Committee on Offices of Profit and the Committee on Public Undertaking.

See also 
 List of Koli people
 List of Koli states and clans

References

External links
 Official web site

1953 births
Living people
Indian National Congress politicians
People from Anand district
Koli people
India MPs 2004–2009
India MPs 2009–2014
Lok Sabha members from Gujarat
Union ministers of state of India with independent charge
Gujarat MLAs 1995–1998
Gujarat MLAs 1998–2002
Gujarat MLAs 2002–2007